Cry-Baby is a musical based on the 1990 John Waters film of the same name. The music is by David Javerbaum and Adam Schlesinger, and the book is by Mark O'Donnell and Thomas Meehan. O'Donnell and Meehan also adapted Waters' film Hairspray for the musical stage. The musical focuses on Baltimore teenager Allison Vernon-Williams, who is drawn across the tracks from her 1954 finishing-school background into a relationship with the orphaned Wade "Cry-Baby" Walker, the leader of a pack of rebel outcasts.

Production
The musical premiered at the La Jolla Playhouse in San Diego, California on November 18, 2007 and ran through to December 16.  Previews began on Broadway at the Marquis Theatre on March 15, 2008, with an official opening on April 24, 2008.  Directed by Mark Brokaw with choreography by Rob Ashford, the cast featured Harriet Harris and James Snyder as "Cry-Baby".

The Broadway production closed following the matinée performance on June 22. The show played 45 previews and 68 performances.

A cast recording featuring most of the original Broadway cast was released on October 7, 2015.

Subsequent activities
According to Javerbaum, the show was remounted by New Line Theatre in St. Louis, Missouri in March 2012. It had a smaller band, reduced to six pieces, and a smaller cast of 16. The show was re-orchestrated and revised by the original composers and writers for the Saint Louis production. It was the first production of the show to be done since Broadway.

In May 2015, The Henegar Center in Melbourne, Florida, was the first community theatre granted permission to produce Cry-Baby: The Musical. The production was directed by Artistic Director, Hank Rion and choreographed by Amanda Cheyenne Manis.

The show premiered in Australia in July 2018, at the Hayes Theatre in Sydney.

The New Zealand premiere of the musical took place in Wellington at Te Auaha in September 2019.

Original Broadway cast
 Wade "Cry-Baby" Walker - James Snyder
 Allison Vernon-Williams - Elizabeth Stanley 
 Lenora - Alli Mauzey
 Mrs. Vernon-Williams - Harriet Harris 
 Dupree - Chester Gregory II 
 Baldwin - Christopher J. Hanke 
 Pepper Walker - Carly Jibson 
 Wanda Woodward - Lacey Kohl 
 Mona Malnorowski/Hatchet-Face - Tory Ross (replaced Courtney Balan (out due to injury) in previews)
 Judge Stone - Richard Poe

Musical numbers

Act I
 "The Anti-Polio Picnic" - Mrs. Vernon-Williams, The Whiffles, Allison, Baldwin, Square Ensemble
 "Watch Your Ass" - Pepper, Wanda, Mona “Hatchet-Face”, Dupree, Cry-Baby, Drape Ensemble
 "I'm Infected" - Allison, Cry-Baby
 "Squeaky Clean" - Baldwin, Allison, The Whiffles
 "Nobody Gets Me" - Cry-Baby, Pepper, Wanda, Mona “Hatchet-Face”, Ensemble
 "Nobody Gets Me (Reprise)" - Allison
 "Jukebox Jamboree" - Dupree
 "A Whole Lot Worse" - Pepper, Wanda, Mona “Hatchet-Face”, Allison
 "Screw Loose" - Lenora
 "Baby Baby Baby Baby Baby (Baby Baby)" - Cry-Baby, Allison, Drape Ensemble
 "Girl, Can I Kiss You With Tongue?" - Cry-Baby, Allison, Drape Ensemble
 "I'm Infected (Reprise)" - Allison
 "You Can't Beat the System" - Company

Act II
 "Misery, Agony, Helplessness, Hopelessness, Heartache and Woe" - Allison, Cry-Baby, Dupree, Pepper, Wanda, Mona “Hatchet-Face”, Ensemble
 "Misery, Agony, Helplessness, Hopelessness, Heartache and Woe (Reprise)" - Mrs. Vernon-Williams
 "All in My Head" - Baldwin, Lenora, Cry-Baby, Allison, Cry-Baby Doubles, Alison Doubles
 "Jailyard Jubilee" - Dupree
 "A Little Upset" - Cry-Baby, Dupree, Drape Ensemble
 "I Did Something Wrong...Once" - Mrs. Vernon-Williams
 "Thanks for the Nifty Country!" - Baldwin, The Whiffles
 "This Amazing Offer" - Baldwin, The Whiffles
 "Do That Again" - Cry-Baby
 "Nothing Bad's Ever Gonna Happen Again" - Company

Critical response
Cry-Baby received mixed reviews. Terry Teachout, in The Wall Street Journal, wrote that the musical "is campy, cynical, totally insincere and fabulously well crafted. And funny. Madly, outrageously funny."  Similarly, Newsday offered that the musical is "pleasantly demented and - deep in the sweet darkness of its loopy heart - more true to the cheerful subversion of a John Waters movie than its sentimental big sister Hairspray."

On the other hand, Ben Brantley, in The New York Times, wrote that the show is "without flavor: sweet, sour, salty, putrid or otherwise. This show in search of an identity has all the saliva-stirring properties of week-old pre-chewed gum....  Mr. Ashford brings his customary gymnastic vigor to the choreography: lots of revved-up jumping jacks, push-ups and leg lifts, usually led by a trio of athletic muscle boys."  Variety added that "watered-down Waters has yielded a flavorless Broadway musical that revels in its down-and-dirtiness yet remains stubbornly synthetic.  There's a lot of talent, sass and sweat onstage, particularly in the dance department, plus a sprinkling of wit in the show's good-natured vulgarity. But somehow, it never quite ignites."  The New York Sun opined that O'Donnell and Meehan "had far more success with another retro-themed Waters adaptation, Hairspray.... Cry-Baby is content to stay in the shallow end and focus on a standard wrong-side-of-the-tracks tale....  But rather than supply a jolt of not-too-outsider-energy, [the songwriters] have instead coasted on their magpie skills, tossing out an undistinguished stream of pastiche numbers. The lyrics occasionally have a welcome crispness....  The songs themselves, however, are as generic as the lyrics are pointed: It's the first time I can recall forgetting a show's melodies before they were even finished."

USA Today wrote "The rockabilly-inspired numbers that David Javerbaum and Adam Schlesinger have crafted for Cry-Baby aren't as ambitious or infectious [as Hairspray], but the show is similarly good-hearted, and has more of a Waters edge. Javerbaum and Schlesinger's lyrics and Mark O'Donnell and Thomas Meehan's book are both more inventively crass and less snarky than those of other contemporary musical winkfests; you get the sense that these writers share Waters' affection for his goofy subjects."

Awards and nominations

Original Broadway production

References

External links
 
 "You Can't Beat the System": Waters Film Is New Musical as Cry-Baby Starts in La Jolla
 New Line Theatre's Cry-Baby webpage

2007 musicals
Broadway musicals
Culture of Baltimore
Musicals based on films
Musicals by Mark O'Donnell
Musicals by Thomas Meehan (writer)
Fiction set in 1954
John Waters
Teen musicals